Charmayne Maxena Maxwell (January 11, 1969  – February 28, 2015), professionally known as Maxee, was a Guyana-born singer–songwriter. In the mid 1990s, Maxwell came to prominence as a member of the female R&B trio Brownstone.

Career
Maxwell found fame in the mid 1990s after she formed the group Brownstone with singers Monica "Mimi" Doby and Nicci Gilbert. After an a cappella audition, the trio were signed to Michael Jackson's Epic Records-distributed imprint, MJJ Music. The band released their debut album From the Bottom Up in 1995 which earned a platinum certification from the Recording Industry Association of America (RIAA) and received a Grammy Award nomination for Best R&B Performance by a Duo or Group with Vocals for their top ten hit single "If You Love Me." After going through the first of a few lineup switches and the release of their commercially less successful second album Still Climbing (1997), the trio disbanded.

Following the disbandment of Brownstone, Maxwell moved to London and signed with Mercury Records in 2000 to pursue a solo career. Her solo debut single "When I Look Into Your Eyes" spawned a remix by producer Fred Jerkins III and peaked at number 55 on the UK Singles Chart. Follow-up "This Is Where I Wanna Be" failed to chart. Its commercial underperformance led to the cancellation of Maxwell's same-titled solo album.

Death
On February 28, 2015, Maxwell died after an accident in Los Angeles. The singer was at her home when she fell and cut her throat on a drinking glass that shattered during the fall. She died shortly afterwards in hospital, aged 46.

Personal life
Maxwell was married to Danish record producer Carsten Schack from duo Soulshock and Karlin. The couple had a son, Nicholas Hojer.

Discography

Singles

References

External links
 

1969 births
2015 deaths
Accidental deaths from falls
African-American women singer-songwriters
American contemporary R&B singers
American women pop singers
American soul singers
20th-century African-American women singers
21st-century African-American women singers